Jerry Thomas Howard (born March 28, 1936) is a former American Democratic politician who served in the Missouri Senate and the Missouri House of Representatives.

Personal life

Born in Oak Ridge, Missouri, Howard graduated from Central High School in Cape Girardeau, Missouri and from Southeast Missouri State University with a bachelor's degree in agriculture and biology.  He has worked in the agribusiness and horse breeding fields, served in the U.S. Army during the Korean War, and also served 16 years in the Missouri National Guard.

His wife Shirla Jean Rathjen Howard from Gouldbusk, Texas, died June 17, 2015, at the Howards' hometown of Dexter, Missouri.  They had been married for over 40 years.

References

1936 births
20th-century American politicians
Democratic Party members of the Missouri House of Representatives
Democratic Party Missouri state senators
Southeast Missouri State University alumni
Living people